Vinni-Pajusti Landscape Conservation Area is a nature reserve situated in Lääne-Viru County, Estonia.

The protected area was designated in 1958 to protect Vinni oaks and its biodiversity. In 2007, the protected area was redesigned to the landscape conservation area.

References

Nature reserves in Estonia
Geography of Lääne-Viru County